The Former Residence of Sun Yat-sen can refer to any of the following places which the Chinese revolutionary Dr. Sun Yat-sen had lived in:

 Former Residence of Sun Yat-Sen (Shanghai)
 Sun Yat Sen Memorial House in Macau
 Former Residence of Sun Yat-sen (Cuiheng)